Visakhapatnam Port is one of 13 major ports in India and the only major port of Andhra Pradesh. It is India's third largest state-owned port by volume of cargo handled and largest on the Eastern Coast. It is located midway between the Chennai and Kolkata Ports on the Bay of Bengal.

History 

Although the need for building a port on the east coast to access Central Provinces was felt by the British in the 19th century, the proposal of Col. H.Cartwright Reid of British Admiralty for constructing a harbour at Visakhapatnam was approved by the Government only after the First World War. The Inner Harbour was built by the Bengal Nagpur Railway between 1927 and 1933 to facilitate the export of manganese ore from the Central Provinces. The port, built at a cost of 378 lakhs was inaugurated by Lord Willingdon on 19 December 1933.

During the Second World War, the military significance of the port increased. After India's independence, the port witnessed growth under the various Five Year Plans. Over time, the port has grown from one with 3 berths handling 1.3 lakh tonnes per annum to one with 24 berths and annual traffic of 65 million tonnes. The port was notified as a major port in 1964 under the Major Port Trusts Act, 1963. Under the Act, the Visakhapatnam Port Trust is in charge of running the port.

Layout of the port 

Visakhapatnam Port has three harbours – the outer harbour, inner harbour and the fishing harbour. The outer harbour has 6 berths capable of handling vessels with a draft up to 17 meters while the smaller inner harbour has 18 berths that are Panamax compatible. Vizag Seaport owns two berths in the inner harbour; berth EQ-8 is fully mechanised and berth EQ-9 berth is not.

The Dolphin's Nose Hill to the north of the entrance channel protects the harbour from cyclones that strike the east coast. The port is located on the area of a creek through which the coastal river Narava Gedda joins the sea.

Hinterland and cargo 
The hinterland of the Visakhapatnam Port extends to north eastern Andhra Pradesh, Chhattisgarh, southern Orissa. Iron ore, manganese ore, steel products, general cargo, coal and crude oil are the main commodities handled at this port. It also handles over 70% Nepal foreign trade as of 2019.

Modernisation 

Visakhapatnam Port is undergoing a modernisation and expansion program aimed at increasing its capacity to 130 million tonnes by 2016–17, entailing an investment of 13,000 crores. The inauguration of the Gangavaram Port, located 15 km away from the Visakhapatnam Port, has led to a significant diversion of traffic away from the Visakhapatnam Port. This loss of cargo traffic is an important reason for the port's fall from its position as the largest port in India.

The Rashtriya Ispat Nigam Limited (RINL) which runs the Vizag Steel Plant had shifted base to the new port, taking with it a large chunk of the coal and iron ore traffic. The Visakhapatnam Port is now modernising its coal handling berth in the outer harbour to enable it to handle capesize vessels. This will also solve the problem of air pollution caused by the open handling of coal that had earlier led to citywide protests.

As part of its modernisation program, the port is also upgrading its general cargo berth in the outer harbour to accommodate vessels of 2 lakh DWT, deepening its inner harbour entrance channel and strengthening five berths in the inner harbour to admit vessels with 12.5 meter draft. Other steps being undertaken include the development of a truck parking terminal and a multimodal logistics hub, the procurement of two 50 tonne tugs and the installation of mechanical handling facilities in the inner harbour for dry bulk cargo. There are also plans to relocate the fishing harbour at the port to allow for the expansion of berths and stacking areas and dredging of the Outer Harbour is also being undertaken to increase the draft of the main channel to 21 meters.

Satellite port at Bhimili 
The Visakhapatnam Port Trust plans to develop a satellite port at Bheemunipatnam to decongest  traffic at Visakhapatnam. The project is expected to cost 2,000 crores and is to be undertaken through a Public- Private Partnership (PPP) venture.

See also 
Gangavaram Port
Hindustan Shipyard
 Ports in India

References

External links 

 
 Visakha Container Terminal
 Vizag Seaport Private Limited (VSPL)

Ports and harbours of Andhra Pradesh
Buildings and structures in Visakhapatnam
Bay of Bengal
Economy of Visakhapatnam
Transport in Visakhapatnam
1933 establishments in British India